Stanborough Hundred was the name of one of thirty two ancient administrative units of Devon, England.

The parishes in the hundred were:
Buckfastleigh,
Churchstow,
Dartington,
Dean Prior,
Diptford,
East Allington,
Holne,
Kingsbridge,
Loddiswell,
Malborough,
Moreleigh,
North Huish,
Rattery,
South Brent,
South Huish,
South Milton,
Thurlestone,
West Alvington and
Woodleigh.

The name of the hundred is derived from the Iron Age fort of Stanborough.

See also 
 List of hundreds of England and Wales - Devon

References 

Hundreds of Devon